The 1938 United States Senate election in Vermont took place on November 8, 1938. Republican Ernest W. Gibson Sr. successfully ran for re-election to another term in the United States Senate, defeating Democratic candidate John McGrath. Gibson Sr. died in June 1940 and his son, Ernest W. Gibson Jr., was appointed to fill the seat until a special election could be held in November 1940.

Republican primary

Results

Democratic primary

Results

General election

Candidates
Ernest W. Gibson Sr. (Republican), incumbent U.S. Senator
John McGrath (Democratic), state senator, milk farmer and businessman

Results

References

Vermont
1938
1938 Vermont elections